Andeimalva is a genus of flowering plants belonging to the family Malvaceae.

Its native range is Peru to Chile.

Species:

Andeimalva chilensis 
Andeimalva machupicchensis 
Andeimalva mandonii 
Andeimalva peruviana 
Andeimalva spiciformis

References

Malvaceae
Malvaceae genera